Ambohitoaka is a town and commune in Madagascar. It belongs to the district of Mampikony, which is a part of Sofia Region. The population of the commune was estimated to be approximately 23,000 in 2001 commune census.

Ambohitoaka is served by a local airport. Primary and junior level secondary education are available in town. The majority 90% of the population of the commune are farmers.  The most important crops are rice and onions, while other important agricultural products are cotton and tobacco.  Industry and services provide employment for 3% and 2% of the population, respectively. Additionally fishing employs 5% of the population.

References and notes 

Populated places in Sofia Region